Ilango Mutharaiyar or Ko Ilango Mutharaiyar , also known as Videl Vidugu Ilangovathi Mutharaiyan, was the last ruler of the Mutharaiyar dynasty (610 AD-851 AD).

Temples
Vijayalaya choleeswaram

There can be seen one of the oldest rock-cut temples built by Ilango Mutharaiyar, which was later rebuilt by Vijayalaya Chola, known as Vijayalaya Choleeswaram. The temple is dedicated to Shiva. There are also two rock-cut caves, one of which has 12 life-size sculptures of Vishnu. The temple is maintained and administered by the Archaeological Survey of India as a protected monument.

Keezhathaniyam temple 
Known as Uthamadhaneeswarar, it is dedicated to Shiva.

See also 
Muthuraja
Perumbidugu Mutharaiyar
Kannappa Nayanar
Thirumangai Alvar

References 

Ancient Tamil Nadu